Philip Russell  may refer to:
Phil Russell (ice hockey) (born 1952), Canadian ice hockey player
Phil Russell, aka Wally Hope (1947-1975), co-founder of the Windsor Free and Stonehenge free festivals
Philip Russell (physicist) (born 1953), researcher into photonics and new materials
Philip Russell (cricketer) (born 1944), Derbyshire cricketer, 1965–1985
Philip Russell (bishop) (1919-2013), Archbishop of Cape Town, South Africa, 1980–1986
P. Craig Russell (born 1951), American comic book writer, artist, and illustrator
Phillip Russell (general), American arbovirologist